Tommaso Riario Sforza (8 January 1782 in Naples – 14 March 1857 in Rome) was the Neapolitan Cardinal who, as protodeacon, announced at the end of the 1846 conclave the election of Cardinal Giovanni Mastai-Ferretti as Pope Pius IX.

He was the son of Duke Nicola Riario Sforza and Princess Giovanna Di Somma. Cardinal Sisto Riario Sforza (1810–1877) was a nephew of his, and Cardinals Pietro Riario, O.F.M. (1445–1474), Raffaele Riario (1461–1521) and Alessandro Riario (1542–1585) were of the same family. Also Girolamo Riario and Caterina Sforza were of the same family.

After serving as an official in the civil administration of the Papal States from 19 April 1804 onward, he was made a cardinal deacon in the consistory of 10 March 1823 and was assigned the deaconry of San Giorgio in Velabro.

After participating in the conclave of 1823, which elected Pope Leo XII, he was ordained a priest on 28 September 1823 and opted for the deaconry of Santa Maria in Domnica on 17 November of the same year. and on 19 December 1834 changed that to the deaconry of Santa Maria in Via Lata.

In the following years he received several successive appointments in the financial administration of the Papal States and was Camerlengo of the Sacred College of Cardinals from 1828 to 1830 and Camerlengo of the Holy Roman Church from 3 April 1843 until his death.

During the sede vacante of 1846, his coat-of-arms, as that of the Camerlengo of the Holy Roman Church, appeared on the coins that were issued. Because he was also Protodeacon, the senior Cardinal Deacon, he made the announcement of the election of Pope Pius IX on 16 June 1846.

He died on 14 March 1857, the last surviving cardinal appointed by Pope Pius VII. Pope Pius IX participated in his funeral in the basilica of Santi Apostoli, where he is buried.

References

External links
The Cardinals of the Holy Roman Church
Catholic Hierarchy 

1857 deaths
1782 births
19th-century Italian cardinals
House of Sforza
Protodeacons
Camerlengos of the Holy Roman Church
Clergy from Naples
Cardinals created by Pope Pius VII